Dietlinde "Lilli" Gruber (born 19 April 1957) is an Italian journalist and former politician.

Currently a talk show host for Italian private television channel La7, Gruber also served as Member of the European Parliament from 2004 to September 2008 with the Olive Tree centre-left coalition.

Biography

Early career and resignation from RAI

Gruber was born in Bolzano and is a German and Italian native speaker. She attended the foreign languages and literature course at the University of Venice. In 1982 Gruber started her journalism career and in 1987 became the anchor of TG1, the main television news program on Rai Uno.

In 1988, she became political correspondent for RAI, covering events such as the collapse of the Soviet Union, the Israeli–Palestinian conflict, the war in the former Yugoslavia, the situation in the United States after the terrorist attacks of 11 September 2001, and the Iraqi war.

In 1999, in addition to her TV career in Italy, she also worked with the German TV broadcasters such as SWF (1988) and Pro 7 (1996).

In April 2004, Gruber resigned from her position at RAI in protest against the influence on state controlled media by Prime Minister Silvio Berlusconi. She attacked his "unresolved conflict of interest", and considered that RAI had abandoned its tradition of pluralism in order to support the government's views. Gruber has also worked for the Italian newspaper La Stampa, for "Io Donna", TV Sorrisi e Canzoni and Anna.

Member of European Parliament
In the European Parliament elections of 2004 she ran as an independent candidate for the European Parliament under the centre-left Olive Tree ticket; her candidacy was proposed, together with Michele Santoro, after she was pushed out of Silvio Berlusconi-controlled RAI. She topped the Olive Tree votes in two electoral regions, and beat Berlusconi himself in the Central region vote. After election, she joined the Socialist Group. Gruber served in the Committee on Civil Liberties, Justice and Home Affairs, and as an alternate on the Committee on Foreign Affairs and Chair of the Delegation for relations with the Gulf States, including Yemen. She resigned from her position in September 2008, months before the natural completion of her mandate, to return to her previous journalism career.

Back into national TV
After her resignation from European Parliament, in 2008 Gruber accepted an offer from private TV channel La7, where she took charge of the long-running political talk show Otto e mezzo.

Bilderberg invitation
She was included in the guest list of Bilderberg Group 2012 edition, at Chantilly, Virginia, as Journalist/Anchorwoman, and was the only journalist allowed at the 2013 meeting in Hertfordshire, England.

Education
 1993: 'William Benton Fellowship for Broadcasting Journalists' at the University of Chicago
 2002: 'Visiting scholar' at the School of Advanced International Studies (SAIS) of Johns Hopkins University; for two years 'discussion leader' at the World Economic Forum of Davos

Awards and honours
 1991: "Numeri UNO" Prize
 1995: Best Female Journalist
 1995: Carlo Schmidt Preis, Germany, for distinguished service to freedom of information
 1995: Fregene prize
 2001: Spoleto prize
 For covering the war in Iraq, inter alia
 2004: Honorary graduate of the American University of Rome

Works
 Quei giorni a Berlino. Il crollo del Muro, l'agonia della Germania Est, il sogno della riunificazione: diario di una stagione che ha cambiato l'Europa, con Paolo Borella, Torino, Nuova Eri edizioni RAI, 1990. .* I miei Giorni a Baghdad ("My Days in Baghdad", 2003)
 L'altro Islam ("The Other Islam", 2004)
 Chador (2005)
 America anno zero ("America year zero", 2006)
 Figlie dell'Islam (2007)
 Streghe (2008)
 Ritorno a Berlino (2009)
 Eredità (2012)
 Tempesta (2014)
 Prigionieri dell'Islam. Terrorismo, migrazioni, integrazione: il triangolo che cambia la nostra vita, Milano, Rizzoli, 2016.

References

External links
Lilli Gruber's Home Page

1957 births
Living people
Writers from Bolzano
Italian television journalists
Germanophone Italian people
Democratic Party (Italy) MEPs
MEPs for Italy 2004–2009
21st-century women MEPs for Italy
Italian women journalists
Women television journalists
Politicians from Bolzano